The East Bay Blazers (more commonly known as the Bay Blazers) are an American professional Twenty20 franchise cricket team that compete in Minor League Cricket (MiLC). The team is based in San Jose, California. It was formed in 2020 as part of 24 original teams to compete in Minor League Cricket. The franchise is owned by Premkumar Suri and Vivek Tummalapalli.

The team's home ground is Santa Clara Cricket Field, located in Santa Clara, California. Former Sri Lankan cricketer Angelo Perera currently helms captaincy duties, while American international Sanjay Krishnamurthi helms vice-captaincy duties.

South African cricketer David White and American international Sanjay Krishnamurthi currently lead the batting and bowling leaderboards with 1,001 runs and 29 wickets respectively.

Franchise history

Background 
Talks of an American Twenty20 league started in November 2018 just before USA Cricket became the new governing body of cricket in the United States. In May 2021, USA Cricket announced they had accepted a bid by American Cricket Enterprises (ACE) for a US$1 billion investment covering the league and other investments benefitting the U.S. national teams.

In an Annual General Meeting on February 21, 2020, it was announced that USA Cricket was planning to launch Major League Cricket in 2021 and Minor League Cricket that summer, but it was delayed due to the COVID-19 pandemic and due to the lack of high-quality cricket stadiums in the USA. Major League Cricket was pushed to a summer-2023 launch and Minor League Cricket was pushed back to July 31, 2021.

USA Cricket CEO Iain Higgins also pointed out cities such as New York City, Houston and Los Angeles with a large cricket fanbase, and targeted them among others as launch cities for Minor League Cricket.

Exhibition league 
In July 2020, the player registration for the Minor League Cricket exhibition league began. On August 15, 2020, USA Cricket announced the teams participating in the exhibition league matches, also listing the owners for each team. The draft for the exhibition league began on August 22, 2020, with the Bay Blazers releasing their squad on August 24. Rusty Theron was later named as captain for the Bay Blazers for the exhibition league.

2021 season 

After the conclusion of the exhibition league, USA Cricket announced that they were planning to launch the inaugural season of Minor League Cricket in spring 2021. Ahead of the official season, which was announced to kick off on July 31, the Grizzlies announced David White as captain with Rusty Theron helming vice-captain duties.

Throughout the group stage, the Blazers lost to the Strikers, the Grizzlies twice, and the Stars once, but won against the Catchers once, and the Blasters, the Lashings, the Surf Riders, and the Seattle Thunderbolts twice. The Blazers finished 3rd at the end of the group stage, thus not qualifying for the finals.

2022 season 

Ahead of the 2022 season, Major League Cricket announced that the draft for that season would take place on May 12. Ahead of the official season, it was announced that former Sri Lankan cricketer Angelo Perera and American international Sanjay Krishnamurthi would replace David White and Rusty Theron as captain and vice-captain respectively throughout the season.

Throughout the season, the Blazers lost once against the Mustangs, won once and lost once against the Strikers and the Thunderbolts, won once against the Lashings, Blasters and the Lone Star Athletics, and won twice against the Blasters, Grizzlies, and the Surf Riders. The Blazers finished third overall in their division, marginally missing out on the play-offs to the Seattle Thunderbolts due to an inferior net run rate (NRR).

Current squad 
 Players with international caps are listed in bold.
  denotes a player who is currently unavailable for selection.
  denotes a player who is unavailable for rest of the season

Statistics

Most runs 

Source: CricClubs, Last updated: 8 March 2023

Most wickets 

Source: CricClubs, Last updated: 8 March 2023

See also 
 Major League Cricket
 Minor League Cricket
 2021 Minor League Cricket season
 2022 Minor League Cricket season
 Minor League Cricket teams

References 

Minor League Cricket teams
Cricket teams in California
Cricket clubs established in 2020
2020 establishments in California